Xagoroloi Bohu Door (Assamese: সাগৰলৈ বহুদূৰ) is a 1995 Indian Assamese language drama film directed by Jahnu Barua. The film was released in 1995.

Plot summary
The story revolves around a boatman who earns his living by sailing boat in the nearby ghats. Problem arises when the government decides to construct a bridge on it which will deprive his earnings. His son who lives in city wants his father only to take care of their property.

Cast
Bishnu Kharghoria as Powal, the old man
Arun Nath as Hemanta, Powal's son
Kashmiri Saikia Baruah as Runumi
Mirel Kuddus as Land agent
Shusanta Barooah as Hkhuman, the boy
Jayanta Bhagawati as Tarun

Awards
National Film Award for Best Feature Film in Assamese (1995)
National Film Award for Best Direction for Jahnu Barua
GETZ Prize( 31st Chicago International Film Festival )
Pri Do Public Award (Best Film: Nantes Film festival, France)

References

External links
 
Rupaliparda

1995 films
Films whose director won the Best Director National Film Award
Films set in Assam
Best Assamese Feature Film National Film Award winners
Films directed by Jahnu Barua
1990s Assamese-language films